Physoschistura elongata is a species of stone loach endemic to India.  This species grows to a length of  TL.

References 
 

Nemacheilidae
Fish described in 1982
Taxa named by Nibedita Sen (scientist)
Taxa named by Teodor T. Nalbant